Acrocercops asaphogramma is a moth of the family Gracillariidae, known from Brazil. It was described by E. Meyrick in 1920.

References

asaphogramma
Moths of South America
Moths described in 1920